Archbishop Curley High School is a Roman Catholic boys' high school in the Roman Catholic Archdiocese of Baltimore in the United States, within the City of Baltimore. It is affiliated with the Conventual Franciscan religious order. It is the brother school to the neighboring girls' school, The Catholic High School of Baltimore.

Early history
The school is named for Michael Joseph Curley, the tenth archbishop of Baltimore and the first archbishop of Washington. It opened in September 1961 with a class of 420 freshmen, and was dedicated on 17 April 1962, by Cardinal Lawrence Shehan.

The building was designed by the local architect Edward H. Glidden and is located on a  campus on the northeast edge of the City of Baltimore.

The first head of school was Fr. Aloysius Balcerak, OFM Conv.. The school's first graduating class matriculated in 1965.

Growth and development
Archbishop Curley High School celebrated its 25th anniversary during the 1985–1986 school year under principal Fr. Gregory Hartmayer (later Archbishop of Atlanta). During that year, a smaller wing was added onto the building to house the instrumental music department facilities, including a concert practice room. Additional athletic facilities were added in an adjacent wing, including the weight room and wrestling room.

In 1994, the school appointed the first head of school to also be an alumnus. Fr. Donald Grzymski, OFM Conv. graduated from Curley in 1970. Fr. Grzymski's tenure as principal is most notable for transitioning the school to a president-principal model, where he continued as head of school in the role of the Curley's first president. Under his leadership, the school undertook its first capital campaign, !Endowing Our Tradition!, with the funds benefiting Curley's endowment. By 1996, Fr. Michael Martin, OFM Conv. '79 had joined Grzymski in the administration as the school's principal.

By 2000, a shift had begun to take place among the faculty and staff. Three notable educators who had served since 1962 all retired after over 30 years each. As E. Patrick Maloney, Richard "Coach" Patry, and Albert E. Frank left the school, a new trend was beginning to emerge. Alumni were increasingly returning to teach and work at their alma mater. By the start of the 21st century, the school had over a dozen such, both in leadership offices and in the classroom.

21st century expansion
 At the start of the 21st century, with the endowment secured, the campus grounds were revamped with new fencing, a concession stand and a new bowl stadium with terraced seating. After the completion of the Bowl project, Fr. Grzymski stepped down as president and Fr. Martin was appointed to succeed him. Fr. Martin in turn was replaced as principal by Mr. Barry Brownlee, who had previously been an assistant under Fr. Martin, and was the first lay principal in the school.

At the end of the 2004–2005 school year, the first phase of a major facilities renaissance was begun. The friary was reconstructed to better reflect the number of religious living on the grounds and the balance of the space provided room for the relocation of the Lawrence Cardinal Shehan Library to the second floor, adjacent to the academic wing of the building. The space previously occupied by the library was renovated to house a new fitness center, with expanded weight training and wrestling room space. An office for the full-time athletic trainer was also added.

A grant provided funds for a rehabilitation of the auditorium seating and, in summer 2005, further renovations funded by a capital campaign provided a new faculty dining room, a relocated bookstore, conference rooms and offices for the development director, athletic director and alumni association. The science laboratories, school roof, tennis courts and student lockers were also rehabilitated.

Capital campaign improvements

Under the theme "In Giving We Receive" an aggressive capital campaign was launched in 2008 to generate funds for improvements to the campus in advance of the school's 50th anniversary in 2011.

In summer 2008, a second parking lot was added and the interior roads were renovated, reestablishing the Auditorium lobby as the main entrance of the school. An elevator, making the academic wing ADA accessible, was completed in the spring of 2009. The auditorium was also temperature-controlled for air-conditioning and heat. Additional renovations have included the gymnasium, main office, auditorium lobby and the guidance office.

In May 2009, ground was broken on a $4 million complex, the Holthaus Center for the Fine Arts. The center is named for Gerard E. Holthaus '67, then-CEO of Algeco Scotsman International, who made a $1 million leadership gift to the building campaign. The new facility, completed in May 2010, houses choral and instrumental music practice rooms, as well as storage for Blackfriars' Theatre and space for the Visual Arts Department. Offices for student media and student activities round out the state-of-the-art complex.

Curley celebrated its fiftieth anniversary during the 2010–2011 school year in honor of its founding in 1960 and its opening in 1961. The theme was "A Year of Jubilee".

A capital campaign was begun in 2018 with the theme "Renewing Our Future." The purpose of this campaign is to air-condition the gymnasium, locker rooms and the academic building classrooms.

Leadership transitions
After nine years as president, Fr. Martin announced in November 2009 that he was stepping down at the conclusion of the 2009–2010 school year. His successor, nominated by the school board and the friars and confirmed by Archbishop Edwin O'Brien, was Fr. Joseph Benicewicz '78, OFM Conv.

After assisting Fr. Benicewicz with the transition to the president's office, Mr. Brownlee announced his retirement as principal. His successor was named as Mr. Philip Piercy. Concurrent to this announcement, Mr. Joseph DellaMonica, vice-president of finance and Curley's longest-tenured employee (43 years), also announced his retirement. With additional changes in both assistant principal offices and campus ministry, 2011–2012 had the largest leadership transition in the school's history.

In July 2014, the archdiocese announced that Fr. Benicewicz and Mr. Piercy would not continue in their roles for the 2014–15 academic year. Fr. Donald Grzymski OFM Conv. agreed to serve again as president. Assistant Principal, Mr. Brian Kohler, was promoted to Principal.

Academics
There are three distinct academic pathways available at school. Mobility and flexibility between pathways is a key value of the curricula.

The Honors Pathway
The Honors Pathway offers a rigorous course of study for intellectually gifted students. St. Bonaventure Scholars is a stand-alone program within the Honors Pathway. These students achieve baccalaureate honors through a Capstone project as well as numerous Advanced Placement courses and electives.

The College Prep Pathway
The college-preparatory curriculum offers development in 21st century skills for students performing at or near grade-level ability. Emphasis is placed on an inquiry-based system of study that engages students across disciplines.

The Anthony Pathway
This adaptive learning curriculum offers support and remediation to student with diagnosed learning differences. Resources are provided to assist students of all ability levels achieve their fullest potential.

Campus life

Campus activities
The school has over 30 clubs and co-curricular activities for students to participate in beyond the classroom. Intramural sports provide students an opportunity for informal recreation and competitive play throughout the school year. A comprehensive summer program for both recreation and academic enrichment is also offered annually.

Campus ministry
Curley's Franciscan Youth Ministry program offers students opportunities for prayer, liturgy and fellowship, as well as a commitment to service, social justice and community outreach.

Sport
Archbishop Curley High School was a founding member of the Maryland Interscholastic Athletic Association (MIAA). After the disbanding of the Maryland Scholastic Association (MSA) in 1994, it was Fr. Robert Twele, then Curley's principal, who led the committee to draft the new organization's constitution and its by-laws. Consequently, championships from 1961 to 1994 are from the MSA and championships since 1995 are from the MIAA.

Fine arts and student media

Additional information

Connection with Franciscan Order

The School Board established by the Archbishop of Baltimore is responsible for the general operation and management of Archbishop Curley High School. There are currently four Franciscan friars on the full-time staff, with one other in-residence. In addition to the Franciscan friars, the faculty includes lay teachers.

Other affiliations and recognitions
Archbishop Curley, as a school within the Archdiocese of Baltimore Department of Catholic Schools, is accredited through AdvancED until 30 June 2022.

The School Board received the Outstanding Board Award in 2007 from the National Catholic Educational Association.

Head of school
From 1961 until 1995, the principal was head of school. Since 1995, the president is head of school. The principal still functions in the role of daily school management and as chief academic officer, reporting to the president. A gallery of formal portraits featuring all the past heads of school is on display in the auditorium lobby.

Current administration
 President - Fr. Donald Grzymski, OFM Conv. '70
 VP: institutional advancement - Barry Stitz '87
 VP: operations & finance - John Kogler
 Principal - Jeremy Joseph
 AP: student affairs - John S. Bowden
 AP: academics - Kenneth Pipkin

Notable alumni

See also
National Catholic Educational Association

References

External links

School website
Roman Catholic Archdiocese of Baltimore

Educational institutions established in 1961
Catholic secondary schools in Maryland
Private schools in Baltimore
Middle States Commission on Secondary Schools
Boys' schools in Maryland
1961 establishments in Maryland